Cliff's Hit Album is Cliff Richard's first compilation album and ninth album overall. It was released in July 1963 and reached number 2 on the UK Albums Chart. The album contains 14 songs from his singles released between August 1958 and May 1962. It includes all Richard's singles in this period that made the top 3 of the UK Singles Chart.

In Canada, the album was retitled "Living Doll" and was released in September 1963 and spent three weeks at number 1 on Chum's Album Index during October and eight weeks in the top 5 altogether.

Release
Cliff's Hit Album was released as an LP album on Columbia in the UK on July 1963. It has not been released on CD, but all tracks are available on other compilation albums.

The Canadian version of the album titled Living Doll was released on Capitol Records and tailored the track-listing to include two recent Canadian hits "Bachelor Boy" and "Lucky Lips" while excluding "A Voice in the Wilderness" and "I'm Looking Out the Window" which had not charted locally.

Track listing

Personnel
Cliff Richard – vocals
Hank Marvin – lead guitar, backing vocals
Bruce Welch – rhythm guitar, backing vocals
Jet Harris – bass guitar
Tony Meehan – drums
Brian Bennett – drums (tracks 6 and 7, side two)
Mike Sammes Singers – backing vocals (track 2 and 4, side two)
Norrie Paramor – his orchestra

Chart performance

Note: Many countries did not have Album charts in 1963.

References

Cliff Richard compilation albums
1962 compilation albums
EMI Columbia Records albums
Albums produced by Norrie Paramor